Volker Pispers (born 18 January 1958) is a German kabarett artist who is well known for his political satire. His comic style includes drastic and sometimes sarcastic commentary on current events, especially about the political situation in Germany but also about the politics of the United States since 9/11 and during the Iraq War.

Biography 

After his Abitur, Pispers moved to Bonn and later Münster where he studied English, theology and pedagogy. From 1979 to 1980 he worked as a foreign language assistant in England, where he developed a liking for black comedy.

After returning to West Germany, he worked as a member of several children's theatre and cabaret arrangements. His first solo programme, Kabarette sich, wer kann (a pun on "rette sich, wer kann" – "save yourself if you can"), first opened in 1983. In the same year he finished his education and started working as an English teacher. In 1990, he became a member of the ensemble of the Kom(m)ödchen in Düsseldorf and later on its artistic director. However, in 1991, he gave up this position to tour Germany with his solo programmes. Over the 1990s he received a number of awards and became a well-known figure in German political cabaret.

In 2002 he first went on tour with his programme ...bis neulich ("...until recently"), which was originally conceived as a Best of his twenty years in cabaret. It was extremely successful and made him a lot more popular, especially due to his harsh criticism of the George W. Bush administration and the Iraq War. Due to its huge success, Pispers continued to tour Germany with the programme, which he frequently updated according to recent developments, until 2015. He has also become a staunch critic of unregulated capitalism.

He currently lives in Düsseldorf-Oberkassel in the German state of North Rhine-Westphalia.

Works

Books 
 1996: Volkerkunde
 2001: Gefühlte Wirklichkeiten
 2003: Volkerkunde (Anniversary Edition)

CDs 
 1995: Frisch gestrichen
 1996: Ein Wort ergab das andere
 1999: Damit müssen Sie rechnen (2 CDs)
 2000: Update 2000 – Damit müssen Sie rechnen (2 CDs)
 2002: … bis neulich (2 CDs)
 2004: … bis neulich 2004 … aktualisierte Fassung (2 CDs)
 2007: Kabarett Sampler: 3. Politischer Aschermittwoch (2 CDs)
 2007: … bis neulich 2007… live in Bonn (2 CDs)
 2009: Volker Pispers live 2009 (2 CDs)
 2010: … bis neulich 2010 … aktualisierte Fassung (2 CDs)
 2012: … live 2012 (2 CDs)
 2014: … bis neulich 2014 (2 CDs)
 2016: … bis neulich – Der letzte Abend (2 CDs)

DVDs 
 2004: live in Berlin. … bis neulich (Live in Berlin)
 2007: … bis neulich 2007… live in Bonn
 2010: … bis neulich 2010
 2014: … bis neulich 2014

Awards 

 1988 – (Mönchen)-Gladbach satire award
 1989 – Kulturpreis der Sparkassen-Kulturstiftung Rheinland (Sponsorship award)
 1996 – Mindener Stichling; Deutscher Kleinkunstpreis (cabaret category)
 1998 – Memminger Maul; Kleinkunstmaske Garching; Gaul von Niedersachsen
 2000 – AZ-Stern des Jahres of Abendzeitung aus München
 2003 – Obernburger Ehrenmühlstein
 2004 – Bocholter Pepperoni
 2005 – Cabaret award "Knurrhahn" sponsored by the city of Wilhelmshaven; Deutscher Kabarettpreis (Main award)
 2006 – Bayerischer Kabarettpreis (Main award)
 2007 – Morenhovener Lupe

References

External links 

 
 
 Homepage of Volker Pispers 
 Volker Pispers at con anima publishers

1958 births
Living people
People from Mönchengladbach
Kabarettists
German cabaret performers